Jim Lanning (born October 10, 1960) is a retired American professional wrestler, best known by the ring name Soldat Ustinov, who competed in North American regional promotions including the National Wrestling Alliance (NWA) and the American Wrestling Association (AWA) during the 1980s.
Before his professional wrestling career, Jim Lanning was a left offensive tackle known for pass blocking - he signed as a free agent with the Dallas Cowboys and briefly played in the USFL for the San Antonio Gun Slingers.

Career

American Wrestling Association (1987 - 1988)
Arriving in the AWA in 1987, he would begin teaming with Boris Zukhov under manager Sheik Adnan Al-Kaissie and together would defeat the Midnight Rockers for the AWA World tag team title in Lake Tahoe, Nevada on May 25, 1987. After defending the titles for almost five months with victories over Wahoo McDaniel & D.J. Peterson on August 10, Zukhov jumped to the World Wrestling Federation in October as part of The Bolsheviks with Nikolai Volkoff.

Replaced by "Pretty Boy" Doug Somers, he and Somers would hold the titles little more than a week before losing them to Jerry "The King" Lawler & "Superstar" Bill Dundee on October 10, 1987.

In 1988, Lanning would team with Sheik Adnan Al-Kaissie losing to Greg Gagne & "The Crippler" Ray Stevens on January 10 and to Wahoo McDaniel & Baron von Raschke on January 17 as well as single matches to Tom Zenk and Stevens.

Later that year, he feuded with Sgt. Slaughter losing to him by disqualification on September 17 although he and Teijho Khan would defeat Slaughter and Keith Eric by countout in a tag team match the following night.

On September 19, Lanning teamed with Khan and Colonel DeBeers in a 6-man tag team match losing to Sgt. Slaughter and The Rock 'n' Roll Express. He and Teijho Khan would later feud with Baron von Raschke and The Top Guns (Ricky Rice & Derrick Dukes) before leaving the promotion by the end of the year.

Championships and accomplishments
American Wrestling Association
AWA World Tag Team Championship (1 time) with Boris Zhukov and replacement partner Doug Somers
Pro Wrestling Illustrated
PWI ranked him # 310 of the 500 best singles wrestlers of the PWI 500 in 1991

Notes

External links
 Profile at Online World of Wrestling

1960 births
Living people
American male professional wrestlers
Faux Russian professional wrestlers
AWA World Tag Team Champions